Red Azalea is a memoir of Chinese American writer Anchee Min (b. 1957).  It was written during the first eight years she spent in the United States, from 1984 to 1992, and tells the story of her personal experience during the Cultural Revolution.

Story
The memoir was written in English.  The names of the characters were translated into English instead of being spelled phonetically.  For example, Min's first name, Anchee, means Jade of Peace, and her siblings' names are Blooming, Coral, and Space Conqueror.  The autobiography deals with themes of ideology and gender and sexual psychology.

Part one
In part one, Min tells the story of her childhood in Shanghai under the rule of Mao Zedong during the 1960s.  She believes wholeheartedly in Mao's Communism, and is an outstanding student.  Her first conflict with this system comes when a favorite teacher is put on trial for espionage and the young Anchee Min is expected to testify against her.

Part two
Part two tells of her life on a farm outside of Shanghai with other teenagers. She is moved to a place called Red Fire Farm, a labor camp. She was assigned to work there and has little hope of escaping her life of manual labor.  At this point, Min finds a role model to follow and stays on track with Maoism. She soon finds difficulty, however, when a friend is mentally broken by interrogation and humiliation after being discovered in a sexual situation with a man.  Abuse of power by her superiors and a lesbian relationship with another farm-worker further erode Min's trust in Maoism. At the end of Part Two, she has been selected to move back to Shanghai and train to be an actress.

Part three
Part three is the story of her training at a film studio, in competition with other young trainees.  More abuse of power and complex love relationships exacerbate her disillusion with Mao's system.  She comes in and out of favor with her superiors in the film studio, depending on who is in charge.  Eventually, her acting career falls through, and Min works as a clerk in the studio.  At the end of part three, in 1976, Mao dies, and his wife Jiang Qing is arrested.  The next few years are briefly mentioned, and the memoir ends with a short explanation of how Min came to live in the United States in 1984.

Edition
Red Azalea. Pantheon Books 1994, 

1993 non-fiction books
Political autobiographies
Pantheon Books books
Books about the Cultural Revolution